Gennady Golovkin vs. Ryōta Murata, billed as Big Drama in Japan, was a middleweight unification professional boxing match contested between IBF and IBO champion, Gennady Golovkin and WBA (Super) champion, Ryōta Murata. The bout took place at Saitama Super Arena, Saitama, Japan on April 9, 2022.

Background 
After multiple rumors of a middleweight unification match between titlists Gennady Golovkin and Ryōta Murata, it was announced on October 27, 2021 that a deal had finally been agreed between the two to stage the bout in the latter's home country of Japan, at the Saitama Super Arena on December 29, 2021. However, the bout was postponed due to Japan closing its borders because of the COVID-19 Omicron variant. It was later rescheduled on April 9, 2022.

Golovkin is a two-time middleweight champion, having held the IBF and IBO titles since defeating Sergiy Derevyanchenko in a fight of the year contender in 2019. He previously held the unified WBA (Super), WBC, IBF and IBO titles between 2014 and 2018, in addition to being ranked as the world's best boxer, pound for pound, from September 2017 to September 2018 by The Ring magazine. Prior to the bout against Murata, he made a record 21st middleweight title defense against Kamil Szeremeta on December 18, 2020.

Murata is an Olympic gold medalist, having claimed gold at the 2012 Summer Olympics. As a professional, he has defeated every opponent he has faced, having avenged decision losses against Hassan N'Dam N'Jikam and Rob Brant with stoppage victories.

The fight 
Murata started fast and seemed to control the pace for some of the early rounds until Golovkin took over by the mid-rounds. Golovkin inflicted tremendous punishment on Murata in round eight. The end came in round nine when after a hard right hand dropped Murata, the Japanese's corner threw in their towel, giving Golovkin a ninth-round technical knockout win.

Fight card

Broadcasting

References 



Boxing matches
2022 in boxing
Sports events postponed due to the COVID-19 pandemic
2022 in Japanese sport
April 2022 sports events in Japan
Sport in Saitama (city)
Boxing in Japan